Sayed Tewfik El-Sayed (born 30 August 1942) is an Egyptian basketball player. He competed in the men's tournament at the 1972 Summer Olympics.

References

External links
 

1942 births
Living people
Egyptian men's basketball players
1970 FIBA World Championship players
Olympic basketball players of Egypt
Basketball players at the 1972 Summer Olympics
Place of birth missing (living people)